
These are the films of Lillian Gish.

Silent: 1912 –  1913 – 1914 – 1915 – 1916 –  1917 – 1918 – 1919 – 1920s  Post Silent:  1930s – 1940s – 1950s – 1960s – 1970s – 1980s – References

Silent

1912

1913

1914

1915

1916

1917

1918

1919

1920s

Post Silent

1930s

1940s

1950s

1960s

1970s

1980s

References
 
 Lilian Gish official website

Actress filmographies
Filmography
American filmographies